Events in the year 2013 in Belgium.

Incumbents

Monarch: Albert II (until 21 July); Philippe (from 21 July)
Prime Minister: Elio Di Rupo

Events
January 1: Bart De Wever (New Flemish Alliance) becomes mayor of Antwerp.
January 6: Noémie Happart crowned Miss Belgium 2013.
January 13: Following accusations of tax evasion, Belgium's Dowager Queen Fabiola of Belgium has her annual allowance cut by over 400,000 pounds.
February 9: Five people killed in a plane crash at Charleroi airport. The airport was closed shortly after the crash.
February 21: 30,000 angry workers take to the streets of Brussels to demonstrate against government austerity plans.
May 4: During a railway accident in Wetteren several tank cars filled with acrylonitrile explode.
May 19: Anderlecht draw against Zulte Waregem to win the Jupiler Pro League.
May 21: Soccer club Beerschot AC declared bankrupt by the Court of Commerce.
May 30: Pope Francis accepts the resignation of Aloys Jousten as bishop of Liège
July 3: King Albert II of Belgium announces his pending abdication in favour of his son Philippe.
July 14: Jean-Pierre Delville consecrated as bishop of Liège
July 21: King Albert II of Belgium abdicates in favour of his son King Philippe.
July 25: First official heatwave in Belgium since the 2006 European heat wave.
August 25: Sebastian Vettel wins the 2013 Belgian Grand Prix.
October 6: Samson Kiptoo Bunge wins the Marathon of Brussels in 2:15.49.
October 8: François Englert and Briton Peter Higgs awarded the Nobel prize for Physics.
October 12: Popgroup Clouseau make a comeback with the song "Vliegtuig" {Airplane} in the Ultratop 50.
October 19: Ten parachutists and a pilot die in a plane crash shortly after take-off.
December 3: Three heavy pile-ups occur on the A19 motorway due to fog
December 7: Veerle Baetens wins the European Film Award for Best Actress. Death of a Shadow wins in the category Best Short Film.

Sports
February 27: Ellen van Dijk wins 2013 Le Samyn des Dames
August 23–26: Ellen van Dijk wins 2013 Lotto-Belisol Belgium Tour

Deaths
 4 January – Amanda Stassart, 89, member of the Resistance during World War II and air hostess
 9 October – Wilfried Martens, 77, former Prime Minister of Belgium.

See also
2013 in Belgian television

References

 
Belgium
2010s in Belgium
Years of the 21st century in Belgium
Belgium